India will compete in the 2024 Summer Paralympics in Paris, France, from 28 August to 8 September 2024. Indian athletes have appeared in every edition of the Summer Paralympics since 1984, though they made their official debut at the 1968 Summer Paralympics.

Competitors

Shooting 

Avani Lekhara booked first quota for the country after winning gold medal at the  Chateauroux Para Shooting World Cup after recording World record. 

Shriharsha Devaraddi Ramakrishna also secured quota after clinching gold in Chateauroux Para Shooting World Cup.

Singhraj Adhana secured India's first quota place in the pistol event from Al Ain 2022 WSPS World Championship. 

Men

Women

Mixed

References 

India at the Paralympics
Nations at the 2024 Summer Paralympics